Charles Everingham IV (also known as Chad Everingham or Charles "Chad" Everingham) is an attorney and former U.S. Magistrate Judge of the United States District Court for the Eastern District of Texas.

Career
Everingham obtained his Bachelor of Arts degree cum laude from Stephen F. Austin State University, majoring in Political Science and minoring in history. He then obtained his Juris Doctor degree cum laude from Baylor Law School in 1993, where he was named the "Highest Ranking Student in the Graduating Class" and also served as lead articles editor on the Baylor Law Review.

Everingham served as a judicial law clerk to the Honorable Howell Cobb, U.S. District Judge of the United States District Court for the Eastern District of Texas from 1993-1994 and then entered private practice by joining the firm of Brown McCarroll & Oaks. He then served as a permanent law clerk to T. John Ward, U.S. District Judge of the United States District Court for the Eastern District of Texas from Jan 3, 2000 to April 2007.

On April 1, 2007, Everingham was appointed as U.S. Magistrate Judge for the United States District Court for the Eastern District of Texas, serving in the same Marshall, Texas federal courthouse as the judge he had previously clerked for, U.S. District Judge T. John Ward. In October 2011, Everingham retired from being a U.S. Magistrate Judge and joined the Longview, Texas office of Akin Gump Strauss Hauer & Feld. His post was succeeded by Judge Roy S. Payne.

Patent Law Legacy
During his tenure on the federal bench in Marshall, Texas, which was growing to become the busiest patent docket in the nation, Everingham handled over 140 Markman hearings (according to Lex Machina) and tried more than 20 complex patent cases. He also served as the U.S. Magistrate Judge to the judge he had previously served as a permanent law clerk to for over seven years, U.S. District Judge T. John Ward, who also heard the most patent cases in the country during his time on the bench and who had also introduced the Local Patent Rules to the United States District Court for the Eastern District of Texas.

External links
Bio of Charles Everingham IV at Akin Gump
American Conference Institute Bio of Charles Everingham
Texas Lawyer Article on Chad Everingham

References

Living people
People from Marshall, Texas
Baylor University alumni
United States magistrate judges
Year of birth missing (living people)